Healthcare in China has undergone basic changes over the twentieth century and twenty-first centuries, using both public and private medical institutions and insurance programs. As of 2020, about 95% of the population has at least basic health insurance coverage. Basic medical insurance includes two systems: employee medical insurance and resident medical insurance. The former covers the urban employed population, and the latter covers the urban non-employed population and the rural population. 25% of the people covered by the basic medical insurance participated in the employee medical insurance, a total of 344 million people; 75% participated in the residents' medical insurance, a total of 1.017 billion people.  Medical assistance has subsidized 78 million poor people to participate in basic medical insurance, and the coverage of poor people has stabilized at over 99.9%. Despite this, public health insurance generally only covers about half of medical costs, with the proportion lower for serious or chronic illnesses. Under the "Healthy China 2020" initiative, China has undertaken an effort to cut healthcare costs, requiring insurance to cover 70% of costs by the end of 2018. In addition, there are policies such as critical illness insurance and medical assistance.

The country maintains two parallel medical systems, one for modern or Western medicine, and one for Traditional Chinese medicine (TCM). Some Chinese consider TCM backward and ineffective, others consider it inexpensive, effective, and culturally appropriate. China has also become a major market for health-related multinational companies. Companies such as AstraZeneca, GlaxoSmithKline, Eli Lilly, and Merck entered the Chinese market and have experienced explosive growth. China has also become a growing hub for healthcare research and development. According to Sam Radwan of ENHANCE International, China’s projected healthcare spending in 2050 may exceed Germany’s entire 2020 gross domestic product.

The above only applies to Mainland China.  Special Administrative Regions of Hong Kong and Macau maintain their own separate universal healthcare systems.

History 
Traditional and folk medicine served as the basis for health care in China. Western-inspired evidence-based medicine made its way to China beginning in the 19th Century. When the Chinese Communist Party (CCP) took power in 1949, national "patriotic health campaigns" and local governments successfully introduced basic sanitary measures and preventative hygiene education. Health care was provided through the place of work, such as the government bureaucratic unit, the enterprise, factory, school, or, in the countryside, the cooperative or commune. During the Cultural Revolution (1966-1976), Mao Zedong's followers attacked medical professionals as elitists. Basic primary care was dispatched to rural areas through barefoot doctors and other state-sponsored programs. Urban health care was also streamlined.

However, beginning with economic reforms in 1978, health standards in China began to diverge significantly between urban and rural areas and coastal and interior provinces. Much of the health sector became privatized. As the commune and state-owned enterprises shut down and the vast majority of urban residents were no longer employed by the state, they also lost much of their social security and health benefits. As a result, the majority of urban residents paid almost all health costs out-of-pocket beginning in the 1990s, and most rural residents simply could not afford to pay for health care in urban hospitals. Free medical treatment was practiced in areas controlled by the CCP before 1949. In February 1951, the industrial and mining departments began to try out labor insurance regulations and solve workers' medical problems. In the same year, free medical treatment was also tried in northern Shaanxi and some ethnic minority areas. On June 27, 1952, the Instructions of the Administration Council on the Practice of Free Medical Treatment and Prevention for State Functionaries of People's Governments at all levels, parties, organizations， and affiliated Institutions were issued. After that, the CCP government gradually communized the medical and health system and modernized it in imitation of the Soviet Union. During the period of planned economy, a tertiary hospital structure was established: a tertiary medical service and epidemic prevention system consisting of municipal and district hospitals and outpatients from sub-districts, factories， and mines. A three-level medical prevention and health care network is established in rural areas, with county hospitals as the leader, township (town) health centers as the hub, and village clinics as the basis.

System reform 
Since 2006, China has been undertaking the most significant healthcare reforms since the Mao era. The government launched the New Rural Co-operative Medical Care System (NRCMCS) in 2005 in an overhaul of the healthcare system, particularly intended to make it more affordable for the rural poor. Under the NRCMCS, some 800 million rural residents gained basic, tiered medical coverage, with the central and provincial governments covering between 30-80% of regular medical expenses. The availability of medical insurance has increased in urban areas as well. By 2011 more than 95% of the total population of China had basic health insurance, though out-of-pocket costs and the quality of care varied significantly, particularly when it came to serious illnesses among children. The health infrastructure in Beijing, Shanghai, and other major cities was approaching developed-world standards and is vastly superior compared to those operating in the rural interior.

Current healthcare system 

The Chinese healthcare system maintains Traditional Chinese Medicine (TCM) and modern medicine as two parallel medical systems. The government invests in TCM research and administration, but TCM is challenged by having too few professionals with knowledge and skills and rising public awareness of modern or western models. Major cities have hospitals specializing in different fields and are equipped with some modern facilities. Public hospitals and clinics are available in cities. Their quality varies by location; the best treatment can usually be found in public city-level hospitals, followed by smaller district-level clinics. These feature reasonably up-to-date medical technology and skilled staff. Most V.I.P. wards also provide medical services to foreigners and have English-speaking doctors and nurses. V.I.P. wards typically charge higher prices than other hospital facilities, but are still often cheap by Western standards. In addition to modern care, traditional Chinese medicine is also widely used, and there are Chinese medicine hospitals and treatment facilities located throughout the country. Dental care, cosmetic surgery, and other health-related services at Western standards are widely available in urban areas, though costs vary. Historically, in rural areas, most healthcare was available in clinics providing rudimentary care, with poorly trained medical personnel and little medical equipment or medications, though certain rural areas had far higher-quality medical care than others. However, the quality of rural health services has improved dramatically since 2009. In an increasing trend, healthcare for residents of rural areas unable to travel long distances to reach an urban hospital is provided by family doctors who travel to the homes of patients, which is covered by the government.

Reform of the health care system in urban areas of China has prompted concerns about the demand and utilization of Community Health Services Centres; a 2012 study, however, found that insured patients are less likely to use private clinics and more likely to use the centers

A cross-sectional study between 2003 and 2011 showed remarkable increases in health insurance coverage and inpatient reimbursement accompanied by increased use and coverage. The increases in service use are particularly important in rural areas and at hospitals. Major advances have been made in achieving equal access to insurance coverage, inpatient reimbursement, and basic health services, most notably for hospital delivery, and use of outpatient and inpatient care.

With substantial urbanization, attention to health care has changed. Urbanization offers opportunities for improvements in population health in China (such as access to improved health care and basic infrastructure) and substantial health risks including air pollution, occupational and traffic hazards, and the risks conferred by changing diets and activity. Communicable infections should also be re-focused on. In 2022, .the BBC's chief international correspondent Lyse Doucet said China had a very good healthcare system including at the provincial level.

Resources 
In 2005 China had about 1,938,000 physicians (1.5 per 1,000 persons) and about 3,074,000 hospital beds (2.4 per 1,000 persons). Health expenditures on a purchasing power parity (PPP) basis were US$224 per capita in 2001 or 5.5 percent of the gross domestic product. Some 37.2 percent of public expenditures were devoted to health care in China in 2001. However, about 80 percent of the health and medical care services are concentrated in cities, and timely medical care is not available to more than 100 million people in rural areas. To offset this imbalance, in 2005 China set out a five-year plan to invest 20 billion renminbi (RMB; US$2.4 billion) to rebuild the rural medical service system composed of village clinics and township- and county-level hospitals. By 2018 this goal had been completed and the country had a total of 309,000 general practitionersor 2.22 per 10,000 people.

There is a shortage of doctors and nurses in China. More doctors are being trained, but most aim to leave the countryside in favor of the cities, leaving significant shortages in rural areas.

In 2016 it was reported that ticket resale was widely practiced at Beijing Tongren Hospital and Peking University First Hospital. Advance tickets for outpatient consultation are sold by the hospitals for 200 yuan but sold for as much as 3,000 yuan. An eye doctor commented that the appointment fees did not reflect the economic value of doctors' skills and experience and that the scalpers were selling the doctor's appointment at a price the market is prepared to pay.

Medical training 
The Chinese medical education system is based on the British model. While some medical schools run three-year programs, hospitals tend to recruit physicians who graduated from five-year programs, while big-name hospitals only accept MDs, which takes seven years of study, including five years of undergraduate studies, followed by the completion of a Ph.D. in medicine. Once a student graduates from medical school, he or she must work 1–3 years in a university-affiliated hospital, after which the student is eligible to take the National Medical Licensing Examination (NMLE) for physician certification, which is conducted by the National Medical Examination Center (NMEC). If the candidate passes, he or she becomes a professional physician and is certified by the Ministry of Health. It is illegal to practice medicine in China as a physician or assistant physician without being certified by the Ministry of Health. Physicians are allowed to open Physiciansics after practicing medicine for five years.

Traditional and modern Chinese medicine 
China has one of the longest recorded histories of medicine records of any existing civilization. The methods and theories of traditional Chinese medicine have developed for over two thousand years. Western medical theory and practice came to China in the nineteenth and twentieth centuries, notably through the efforts of missionaries and the Rockefeller Foundation, which together founded Peking Union Medical College. Today Chinese traditional medicine continues alongside western medicine and traditional physicians, who also receive some western medical training, are sometimes primary caregivers in the clinics and pharmacies of rural China.  Various traditional preventative and self-healing techniques such as qigong, which combines gentle exercise and meditation, are widely practiced as an adjunct to professional health care.

Although the practice of traditional Chinese medicine was strongly promoted by the Chinese leadership and remained a major component of health care, Western medicine gained increasing acceptance in the 1970s and 1980s. For example, the number of physicians and pharmacists trained in Western medicine reportedly increased by 225,000 from 1976 to 1981, and the number of physician assistants trained in Internal Medicine increased by about 50,000. In 1981 there were reportedly 516,000 senior physicians trained in Western medicine and 290,000 senior physicians trained in traditional Chinese medicine. The goal of China's medical professionals is to synthesize the best elements of traditional and Western approaches.

In practice, however, this combination has not always worked smoothly. In many respects, physicians trained in traditional medicine and those trained in Western medicine constitute separate groups with different interests. For instance, physicians trained in Western medicine have been somewhat reluctant to accept unscientific traditional practices, and traditional practitioners have sought to preserve authority in their own re. Although Chinese medical schools that provided training in Western medicine also provided some instruction in traditional medicine, relatively few physicians were regarded as competent in both areas in the mid-1980s.

The extent to which traditional and Western treatment methods were combined and integrated into the monitor hospitals variety they monitor hospitals and medical schools of purely traditional medicine was established. In most urban hospitals, the pattern seemed to be to establish separate departments for traditional and Western treatment. In the county hospitals, however, traditional medicine received greater emphasis.

Traditional medicine depends on herbal treatments, acupuncture, acupressure, moxibustion (burning of herbs over acupuncture points), "cupping" (local suction of skin), qigong (coordinated movement, breathing, and awareness), tui na (massage), and other culturally unique practices. Such approaches are believed to be most effective in treating minor and chronic diseases, in part because of milder side effects. Traditional treatments may be used for more serious conditions as well, particularly for such acute abdominal conditions as appendicitis, pancreatitis, and gallstones; sometimes traditional treatments are used in combination with Western treatments. A traditional method of orthopedic treatment, involving less immobilization than Western methods, continued to be widely used in the 1980s.

Employment Insurance Regulations 
In 1951, the State Council issued the Regulations of the People's Republic of China on Labour Insurance, which is a sole proprietorship that stipulates the main recipient of the insurance medical treatment labor insurance medical treatment, and that reference could be made to workers of collectively owned enterprises in towns above the county level. However, the beneficiaries of the Labour Insurance Regulations were limited to state-run or more stable employment enterprises that provided more than 100 jobs, at a time when there were only about 1.2 million industrial workers in China, a tiny proportion of the 500 million Chinese population.

The coverage of the Labour Insurance Regulations was further extended in 1953 and 1956 respectively and was eventually introduced in all enterprises that were state-owned in 1956. The Labour Insurance Regulations were also introduced or applied by reference to the larger, better-off, collectively owned enterprises. But even so, the expanded beneficiary population still represents a very small proportion of the sizeable Chinese population. According to statistics for 1957, the urban population accounted for only 15.39% of the country's total population in that year, and the number of people employed in establishments and government departments with regular incomes totaled less than 20% of the urban population.

In the 1950s and early 1960s, employees of enterprises covered by the Labour Insurance Regulations were required to pay for medical treatment, surgery, hospitalization, and general medicine for general illnesses, non-work-related injuries, and disabilities, but the cost of expensive medicine, hospital meals, and travel expenses were borne by the employees themselves[9]. In the event of illness of an immediate family member supported by the employee, he or she may be treated in the hospital of the enterprise or other special hospitals, and the enterprise shall bear half of the cost of surgery and ordinary medicine.

In 1966, the Ministry of Labour and the All-China Federation of Trade Unions issued the Circular on Several Issues Concerning the Improvement of the Labour Insurance Medical System for Enterprise Workers, which appropriately increased the burden of medical treatment on individual workers to prevent such phenomena as "soaking the sick" and "treating small illnesses in a big way. "In 1966, the Ministry of Labour and the All-China Federation of Trade Unions issued a circular on several issues relating to the improvement of the labor insurance medical system for enterprise workers.

The source of funding for labor insurance and medical care, all of which were covered by the administration of the enterprises before 1953. In 1953, the fund was changed to 5%-7% of the total wage according to the nature of the industry. To facilitate the coordinated use of the fund by enterprises, in 1969 the Ministry of Finance stipulated that the welfare fund, which had been withdrawn at 2.5% of total wages, the incentive fund, which had been withdrawn at 3%, and the medical and health fund, which had been withdrawn at 5.5%, were to be combined and replaced by an employee welfare fund, which was to be withdrawn at 11% of total wages and used mainly for medical and health expenses and welfare expenses.

Primary care 
After 1949 the Ministry of Public Health was responsible for all healthcare activities and established and supervised all facets of health policy. Along with a system of national, provincial, and local facilities, the ministry regulated a network of industrial and state enterprise hospitals and other facilities covering the health needs of workers of those enterprises. In 1981 this additional network provided approximately 25 percent of the country's total health services.

Health care was provided in both rural and urban areas through a three-tiered system. In rural areas, the first tier was made up of barefoot doctors working out of village medical centers. They provided preventive and primary-care services, with an average of two doctors per 1,000 people; given their importance as healthcare providers, particularly in rural areas, the government introduced measures to improve their performance through organized training and an annual licensing exam. At the next level were the township health centers, which functioned primarily as outpatient clinics for about 10,000 to 30,000 people each. These centers had about ten to thirty beds each, and the most qualified members of the staff were assistant doctors. The two lower-level tiers made up the "rural collective health system" that provided most of the country's medical care. Only the most seriously ill patients were referred to the third and final tier, the county hospitals, which served 200,000 to 600,000 people each and were staffed by senior doctors who held degrees from 5-year medical schools. Utilization of health services in rural areas has been shown to increase as a result of the rise in income in rural households and the government's substantial fiscal investment in health.  Health care in urban areas was provided by paramedical personnel assigned to factories and neighborhood health stations. If more professional care was necessary the patient was sent to a district hospital, and the most serious cases were handled by municipal hospitals. To ensure a higher level of care, several state enterprises and government agencies sent their employees directly to the district or municipal hospitals, circumventing the paramedical, or barefoot doctor, stage.
However, primary care in China has not developed as well as intended. The main barrier has been the scarcity of suitably-qualified health professionals.

Deficiencies and problems of health care in China

Medicare Sustainability Issues 
China is a country with the fastest aging population and the largest scale in the world, and the family security function is continuously weakened due to the declining birthrate and aging population. There will be a great demand for medical resources in the future.  However, urban and rural residents are still looking forward to the continuous reduction of the medical burden of personal diseases. At the same time, the growth rate of the national economy has dropped from double digits in the 20th century to single digits, and in 2016, it dropped to about 7%, and the growth rate of fiscal revenue has also dropped from over 20% to single digits. Therefore, the slowdown in the growth of national fiscal revenue and the rapid growth of national welfare has become a real contradiction.

Hospital refuses Medicare patients 
At the end of 2013, as the use of medical insurance funds was approaching the bottom line of excess, in many provinces and cities across the country, only self-paying patients did not receive medical insurance patients.

In 2010, to prevent the loss of medical insurance funds caused by fraudulent insurance and large prescriptions, Jinan City began to assess the total hospital expenses and number of visits, and the medical insurance pooling fund for overspending will not be paid. Hospitals began to put pressure on doctors to deduct the income of departments and doctors if they exceeded the limit. Therefore, this practice leads to the department rejecting medical insurance patients as soon as the quota is full." The most willing to accept patients are self-funded patients, public-funded medical patients, and medical insurance patients in monopoly industries such as finance and electricity. The average age of their employees is low, the rate of medical treatment is low, and the ability to pay funds is strong, and they are unwilling to accept local ordinary medical insurance patients.  According to reports, in 2016, the Second Xiangya Hospital of Central South University in Hunan, Kunming Children's Hospital, and the 82nd Army Hospital of the Chinese People's Liberation Army in Baoding 2019 also refused to accept medical insurance patients.

In 2020, the Hebei Provincial Medical Security Bureau issued the "Notice on Preventing Medical Insurance Designated Medical Institutions to Prevaricate and Refuse to Accept Insured Persons", requiring medical security departments at all levels to conscientiously do a good job in the enjoyment of medical security benefits for insured persons during the end of the year, and resolutely put an end to prevarication and refusal The behavior of insured persons.

Erosion of health insurance funds, excessive medical treatment 
In 2016, a study reported that a large number of doctors and patients conspired to erode medical insurance funds in China. Several media have disclosed that the means of eroding the medical insurance fund include farmers being “hospitalized”, treating patients without illness, falsely increasing the number of days a patient is hospitalized, fake medication, fake surgery, excessive examinations, serious treatment of minor illnesses, repeated charges, and failure to provide Charges for services (empty charges), listing surgical treatment expenses that are not within the scope of reimbursement as reimbursement, retail pharmacies swiping medical insurance cards to sell daily necessities. However, without the use of medical insurance funds, some medical institutions will be unsustainable, and may not be able to pay wages or repay loans. Affected by all parties, the regulatory authorities often cast their doubts on the rat. In the whole year of 2019, China's medical insurance departments at all levels inspected a total of 815,000 designated medical institutions, and investigated and dealt with 264,000 medical institutions that violated laws and regulations; a total of 33,100 people who participated in violations of laws and regulations were dealt with, and a total of 11.556 billion yuan was recovered. At the same time, over-diagnosis, over-examination, and over-medication in the medical industry have become common phenomena due to the loss of profitability of hospitals and the supply of medicines, which wastes medical resources.

In response to these problems, various localities have begun to coordinate and supervise medical insurance funds; explore the introduction of medical insurance intelligent monitoring systems to intelligently review medical insurance funds; centrally purchase pharmaceutical consumables to save money and increase the proportion of medical labor technology value in fund settlement.

Causes of medicine prices 
Industry experts in mainland China believe that for a long time, the medical authorities have not rejected the income-generating behavior of hospitals. Because medical care is cheap and generous, it is impossible to require high quality at the same time. This is a congenital contradiction. Therefore, high-quality medical behavior and medication It is not excluded hospitals use this as additional income, to avoid the low income of the medical profession unable to retain talents to study medicine or doctors to go abroad. Therefore, in addition to the common phenomenon of hospitals investing in pharmacies and other "three industries", it is also an open norm for salesmen of many pharmaceutical companies to travel to doctors' homes to give dividends. There are no standard answers to prescribeprescribing medicine for many diseases, and the dosage also depends on the case. Ultimately The disease can be cured. At this time, prescribing a certain drug and the dosage becomes the right of the doctor to have a free heart. Therefore, the salesperson of the pharmaceutical factory and the doctor have common interests.

Another problem is that the laws and regulations give hospital managers too much discretion. Although all medicines are listed in the medical insurance payment catalog, no law stipulates that all medicines in the hospital pharmacy must be purchased in sufficient quantities, so hospitals often use "medicine". There is a feasible way to make money by guiding patients to recommend stores at their own expense. At the beginning of 2019, the General Office of the State Council issued the document "Opinions on Strengthening the Performance Evaluation of Tertiary Public Hospitals". The black hole of drug prices caused by the problem of the drug storehouse has been noticed, but the hospitals in various provinces and cities received this outline document, and finally formed the county and city The government penalty, and then implemented in the hospital, may take many years to achieve. At this stage, patients, unfortunately, encounter the medical ethics problem of the black hole at their own expense, and can only defend their rights and interests using legal disputes:

1.Patients or their family members can check the medical insurance drug catalog at any time to identify whether their medication is in the catalog

2. When asking a doctor for a self-funded pharmacy, you must refuse it decisively and fight with the catalog

3. When the doctor said that "the drug store is out of stock and the hospital did not enter this medicine" as an excuse, he asked to start an additional procurement process

4. If the additional procurement process has not been approved within a reasonable time of three or two days, you can report directly to the Municipal Health and Health Commission or the provincial Health and Health Commission at a higher level.

See also 
 Health in China
 Healthcare reform in China

References and further reading

Notes

External links 

 An Essential Guide to Chinese Healthcare System